The Treaty of Conflans (or the Peace of Conflans) was signed on 5 October 1465 between King Louis XI of France and Count Charles of Charolais. This treaty was signed months after the Battle of Montlhéry (13 July 1465), where the French dukes of Alençon, Burgundy, Berry, Bourbon and Lorraine fought King Louis to a standstill.

Details
The dukes forced King Louis to sign the agreement, which officially ended the League of the Public Weal. Based on the terms of the treaty, Normandy was restored to the Duke of Berry and Burgundy reclaimed Boulogne and Ponthieu. The treaty confirmed female inheritance for Macon, Auxerre, Bar-sur-Seine, Boulogne, and the Somme.

Aftermath
Months later, King Louis declared to the Parlement at Paris that the treaties of Conflans and Saint Maur were null and void, having been signed under duress. Consequently, Louis would attempt to avoid the treaty, as well as to split the French dukes by diplomatic means.

References

Sources

See also
List of treaties

External links

Chronology of More Recent Times 1401 A.D. to 1500 A.D.
The Catholic Encyclopedia - Burgundy

1465 in Europe
1460s in France
1460s treaties
Conflans